The Third Assembly of Pondicherry Troisième Assemblée de Pondichéry (17 March 1969 - 3 January 1974) succeeded the Second Assembly of Pondicherry and was constituted after the victory of Indian National Congress (INC) and allies in the 1969 Pondicherry Legislative Assembly election. These were the second Legislative Assembly elections after the formation of the new Union Territory. After the elections M. O. H. Farook of Dravida Munnetra Kazhagam got elected as chief minister.

See also 
Government of Puducherry
List of Chief Ministers of Puducherry
Puducherry Legislative Assembly
Pondicherry Representative Assembly
1964 Pondicherry Legislative Assembly election

References

Puducherry Legislative Assembly
Puducherry
1969 establishments in Pondicherry